Maruya may refer to:

People

 Saiichi Maruya (丸谷 才一), Japanese author and literary critic
 Kaori Maruya (丸谷 佳織), Japanese politician
, Japanese swimmer

Other uses
 Maruya (Philippine cuisine), banana fritters from the Philippines

Japanese-language surnames